Church End is a hamlet located in Bedfordshire, England.

The settlement forms part of the wider Totternhoe village (where the 2011 Census  population was included) and civil parish, with Church End being the closest part of the parish to the larger town of Dunstable. Totternhoe Lower School is located in Church End, as is "The Old Farm Inn" public house.

Hamlets in Bedfordshire
Central Bedfordshire District